"Don't Mess with Bill" is a million-selling Gold-certified 1966 single recorded by The Marvelettes for Motown Records' Tamla label. Written and produced by Smokey Robinson, "Don't Mess with Bill" features a lead vocal by Wanda Young. The single peaked at number seven on the Billboard Hot 100 in February 1966, and at number three on Billboard's R&B singles chart. "Don't Mess with Bill" was the Marvelettes' final Top 10 single.

Background
The titular "Bill" referenced is not an allusion to the song's author, Bill "Smokey" Robinson. Robinson reports that he chose the name because it fit the lyrics, not because it was his. 

Cash Box described it as a "funky medium-paced pop-blues shuffler about love-struck gal who serves notice on one and all to leave her fella alone."

Personnel
Lead vocals by Wanda Young Rogers
Background vocals by the Andantes: Jackie Hicks, Marlene Barrow, and Louvain Demps
Instrumentation by the Funk Brothers
Bass – James Jamerson
Congas – Eddie "Bongo" Brown
Drums – Benny Benjamin
Guitar – Robert White
Organ – Earl Van Dyke
Baritone saxophone – Andrew "Mike" Terry
Tenor saxophone solo – Norris Patterson
Trombone – Don White, Paul Riser
Trumpet – Floyd Jones, John Trudell
Vibraphone – Jack Ashford

Chart performance

Other versions
It was included as part of The Spinners "Superstar Medley" and released on the 1975 "Spinners Live!" album.
"Don't Mess with Bill" has also been recorded and released by Monalisa Young.

References

The Marvelettes songs
1965 songs
1966 singles
Songs written by Smokey Robinson
Motown singles
Song recordings produced by Smokey Robinson